Sheykh Saad (also Romanized as Sheykh Saʿad) is a village in Sorkheh Rural District, Fath Olmobin District, Shush County, Khuzestan Province, Iran. At the 2006 census, its population was 34, in 9 families.

References 

Populated places in Shush County